Samy A. Mahmoud was the 5th chancellor of University of Sharjah (2008-2013), and formerly the acting president of Carleton University (2006-2008).

Biography 

Samy A. Mahmoud was the 5th chancellor of the University of Sharjah (2008-2013). Previously, he served as the acting president of Carleton University, appointed in November, 2006, after the resignation of David W. Atkinson. He is at present professor of systems and computer engineering at Carleton University, leading a research group on sensor technologies and platforms.

Dr. Mahmoud graduated from Carleton University in 1975 with a doctorate in electrical engineering. He has served various roles at Carleton, including acting provost, vice-president (academic), dean of the Faculty of Engineering and Design and chair of the Department of Systems and Computer Engineering.

See also
List of Canadian university leaders

References

External links
 University of Sharjah Website
 Carleton University's Website

Presidents of Carleton University
Carleton University alumni
Living people
Academic staff of the University of Sharjah
Year of birth missing (living people)